Two ships of the United States Navy have borne the name USS Sunfish, named in honor of the ocean sunfish, Mola mola, a plectognath marine fish, having a deep body truncated behind, and high dorsal and anal fins.

She made eleven war patrols in the Pacific during World War II.

United States Navy ship names